Kawina may refer to:
 Kawina (trilobite), a genus of trilobite in the order Phacopida
 Kawina (music), a musical genre from Suriname